Landesbergen is a municipality in the district of Nienburg, in Lower Saxony, Germany. It is situated on the right bank of the Weser, approx. 10 km southwest of Nienburg, and 35 km northeast of Minden.

Landesbergen was the seat of the former Samtgemeinde ("collective municipality") Landesbergen.

References

Nienburg (district)